Evarcha cancellata is a species of spider of the genus Evarcha. It is native to Sri Lanka and Java.

References

Salticidae
Fauna of Java
Spiders of Asia
Spiders described in 1902